Prince Gustav of Vasa, Count Itterburg (9 November 1799 at Stockholm – 4 August/5 August 1877 at Pillnitz), born Crown Prince of Sweden, was the son of King Gustav IV Adolf of Sweden and Queen Frederica. His Austrian princely title (from 1829) was actually spelled Wasa.

Life and career
After his birth, he was raised under the supervision of the royal governesses Hedvig Ulrika De la Gardie and Charlotte Stierneld in succession.

When he was ten years old, his father was deposed by the Coup of 1809 and the family was forced into exile. The Gustavian party tried to get him accepted as crown prince in 1809 and 1810, but were unsuccessful. Queen Charlotte, wife of the new king, was one of the leading figures of the Gustavian Party, and often visited ex-queen Frederica in her house arrest and worked for prince Gustav to be acknowledged as heir to the throne. She wrote of this issue in her diaries: during a dinner, General Georg Adlersparre told her that Jean Baptiste Bernadotte had asked whether she had any issue, and was interested when he found she had not. She said that the throne already had an heir in the deposed King's son. Adlersparre became upset and expressed the opinion of his party that none of the instigators of the coup would accept this as they feared that the boy would take revenge against them when he became King, and that they would go as far as take up the old rumour that the deposed King was, in fact, illegitimate and the son of Queen Sophia Magdalena and Count Adolf Fredrik Munck af Fulkila to prevent this.

Between the time after the coup and before the royal family left Sweden, they were held under house arrest. During that period, Queen Charlotte described him in her famous diary as an obedient and dutiful child with a great ability to learn. He was not haughty as his younger sister Princess Sophie, but humble. Rather, he seemed too quiet and too careful for his age. When Princess Sophie asked him why their father was no longer King, he told her that it was best not to talk about it. He asked no questions and did not appear to miss his father. After he was told that his father had been deposed, he acted embarrassed towards his mother. However, when she told him that he too had lost his position as heir, he cried and embraced her without a word. The announcement gave him much relief and happiness.

In 1816, he assumed the title of Count of Itterburg. He served as an officer to the Habsburgs of Austria, and in 1829, Emperor Francis I created him Prince of Vasa. During the Greek War of Independence (1821–1829) there was some talk of Gustav becoming its first king, but this never materialized. He was made a Field Marshal-Lieutenant in the Austrian Army in 1836.

Marriage and issue
In 1828, he became engaged to Princess Marianne of the Netherlands, but political pressure forced an end to any wedding plans. On 9 November 1830, he married in Karlsruhe his first cousin Princess Louise Amelie of Baden (5 June 1811 in Schwetzingen – 19 July 1854 in Karlsruhe). They divorced in 1843. A son, Louis, was born in 1832 but died shortly after birth. Their daughter, Princess Carola, married the Catholic King Albert I of Saxony, but they had no issue.

Gustaf died on 5 August 1877. In 1884, his (and his infant son's) remains were moved to Stockholm, to be buried beside his father.

Honours

Awards

Ancestry

References 

  (search for all versions on WorldCat)

1799 births
1877 deaths
Crown Princes of Sweden
Gustav 1799
People from Stockholm
Heirs apparent who never acceded
House of Holstein-Gottorp
Burials at Riddarholmen Church
Disinherited European royalty
Sons of kings
Grand Crosses of the Order of Saint Stephen of Hungary
Bailiffs Grand Cross of Honour and Devotion of the Sovereign Military Order of Malta
Recipients of the Order of St. Anna, 1st class
Recipients of the Order of the Netherlands Lion
Royal reburials